A ball is a spherical round object with various uses.

Ball(s) or The Ball may also refer to:

Places
 Ball (crater), a crater on the Moon
 Ball, Cornwall, a hamlet in the north of Cornwall, England, UK
 Ball, Louisiana, a town in Rapides Parish, Louisiana, US
 Balls (mountain range), a mountain range in Madera County, California, US

People with the surname 
 Ball (surname), a list of people with the surname Ball
 Ed Balls, a British politician
 Katy Balls, a British journalist
 William Lawrence Balls, a British botanist

Anatomy
 Ball (foot), a bottom part of the foot
 Balls, bollocks, bullocks, or cojones, a slang word for testicles, which may also apply to chutzpah or bravery

Arts and entertainment

Film and theatre
 Le Bal (1931 film), a French film
 The Ball (1958 film) (Mingea), a Romanian film
 Le Bal (1983 film), an Algerian film
 Balls (film) (Swedish: Farsan), a 2010 Swedish comedy film
 The Ball (2011), an Australian documentary, runner up for the 2011 AACTA Award for Best Documentary Under One Hour
 The Ball (play), a 1632 play by James Shirley

Games
 Ball (Game & Watch), a game for the Nintendo Game & Watch
 The Ball (video game), a 2010 video game

Music

Groups
 Balls (rock band), a 1969–1971 British rock band
 B.A.L.L., a 1987–1990 American rock band

Albums
 Ball (Iron Butterfly album), 1969
 Ball (Widespread Panic album), 2003
 Balls (Elizabeth Cook album), 2007
 Balls (Sparks album), 2000
 Balls (EP), by Guttermouth, 1991
 Balls, by Napoleon Murphy Brock, 2003

Songs
 "Ball" (song), by T.I., 2012
 "Ball", by DJ Khaled from Victory, 2010
 "Ball", by Susumu Hirasawa from Sword-Wind Chronicle BERSERK Original Soundtrack, 1997
 "The Ball", from the musical Natasha, Pierre & The Great Comet of 1812, 2012
 "Un bal", the second movement of Symphonie fantastique by Hector Berlioz, 1830

Television
 Balls (TV channel), a defunct Filipino sports channel
 "The Ball" (Dynasty 1985), an episode
 "The Ball" (Dynasty 1986), an episode
 "The Ball" (Kanon), an episode

Brands and enterprises
 Ball (St. Paul's Churchyard), an historical bookseller in London
 Ball Corporation, a U.S. packaging manufacturer and metal can maker
 Ball Watch Company

Computing and technology
 BALL (Biochemical Algorithms Library), a versatile set of C++ classes for molecular modelling
 Blog Assisted Language Learning, an application of computer-assisted language learning

Schools
 Ball High School, a public secondary school in Galveston, Texas, US
 Ball State University, Muncie, Indiana, US

Social gatherings
 Ball (dance party)
 The Ball (event), a NYC Jewish singles event on Christmas Eve
 Times Square Ball or the Ball

Sports
 Ball (rhythmic gymnastics)
 Baseball (ball), the physical object
 Ball (baseball statistics), a pitch outside the strike zone and not swung at by the batter
 Basketball (ball)
 Cricket ball, the physical object
 Ball (cricket) or delivery, a single action of bowling
 Football (ball)
 Ball (association football)
 Gaelic ball
 Gridiron ball
 Rugby ball
 Golf ball
 Handball (ball)
 Pickleball, the ball used in the game
 Ball!, a warning of an errant ball on the court
 Softball (ball)
 Tennis ball
 Whiffle ball or wiffle ball

Other uses
 Ball (bearing), special highly spherical and smooth balls, most commonly used in ball bearings
 Ball (mathematics), the solid interior of a sphere
 Ball of wax example, also known as the wax argument, a thought experiment by René Descartes in his Meditations on First Philosophy
 Boule de Genève (Geneva ball), a type of pendant watch in the shape of a small ball
 Round shot or cannonball or ball, a round projectile fired from guns and cannons

See also
 Bawl (disambiguation)
 Bawls, a high-caffeine soft drink
 Thermoball, a swarm of insects (especially bees) in collective defense against larger insects, such as predatory wasps
 Ballz, a 1994 fighting game
 :Category:Balls, an index of game balls and other types of round balls